East Timor participated in the 2005 Southeast Asian Games held in multiple venues in the Philippines from November 27, 2005 to December 5, 2005. The chief of mission to the games was Antonio Ximenes.

Participation details
This was the second Southeast Asian Games in which the country had participated. East Timor won three bronze medals, all in Arnis. Elisabeth Yanti Almeida dos Santos had never played the sport previously before competing. The other medallists were Francisca Varela and Fortunato Soares.

Medalists

References

2005 in East Timorese sport
2005
Nations at the 2005 Southeast Asian Games